= The Metric Mile =

Board game published by Lambourne Games

The Metric Mile is a board game published in 1986 by Lambourne Games.

== Contents ==
The Metric Mile is a game in which players can recreate races between some of the greatest racers.

== Reception ==
Ellis Simpson reviewed The Metric Mile for Games International magazine, and gave it 4 stars out of 5, and stated that "Metric Mile is a gem of a game. it provides honest to goodness fun without pages of rules. The atmosphere and the flavour of the real event is beautifully captured in cardboard form."
